The 1969 Intercontinental Cup was a two-legged association football match contested between 1968–69 European Cup champions Milan and 1969 Copa Libertadores winners Estudiantes de La Plata. It was the 10th edition of the competition.

The first leg was played at the San Siro in Milan, on 8 October 1969. Milan won the home game 3–0. The return leg was held two weeks later, on 22 October, at La Bombonera in Buenos Aires. Despite suffering a 2–1 defeat, Milan won the title on aggregate.

Violence on pitch 

Amongst other things, the tie became infamous for the violent on-pitch conduct and dirty tactics employed by Estudiantes' players in the second leg of the fixture. 

Estudiantes' players used violence from the beginning, with Alberto Poletti and Ramón Aguirre Suárez throwing balls to a group of Milan players that were practising on the field prior to the match. With the game already in progress, Eduardo Manera pushed around goalkeeper Fabio Cudicini, then he bit Saul Malatrasi. Aguirre Suárez (one of the most violent players) injured Néstor Combin and Pierino Prati, although he would not be expelled until another violent action against Gianni Rivera.

After a match which saw two Italian players badly assaulted, events took a turn for the surreal when stretcher-bound Milan striker Néstor Combin was arrested by Argentine police for draft dodging (Combin had been born in Argentina but had represented France at international level, having moved to Europe for his professional career). The match had immediate political ramifications, partly due to Argentina's bid for the World Cup in 1978. Many of the team's players were arrested and goalkeeper Alberto Poletti, who had punched Milan's "golden boy" playmaker Gianni Rivera, kicked Combin and had clashed with supporters after the match, was handed a life ban. Ramon Suárez, who had broken the nose of Combin, was banned from international fixtures for five years. The match is also partly to blame for a subsequent boycott of the tournament by European teams.

First leg

Match details

Second leg

Match details

See also
1968–69 European Cup
1969 Copa Libertadores
A.C. Milan in European football

References

External links

Match details and lineups at RSSSF.com
Match reports at UEFA.com

 

i
i
i
i
1969
i
Estudiantes de La Plata matches
Football in Buenos Aires
International club association football competitions hosted by Italy
International club association football competitions hosted by Argentina
October 1969 sports events in Europe
Sports competitions in Buenos Aires
Sports competitions in Milan
1969 Intercontinental Cup
1969 Intercontinental Cup
Brawls in team sports
October 1969 sports events in South America